The Mercedes Benz M180 Engine was a  single overhead camshaft inline-6 cylinder engine introduced at the Frankfurt Motor Show in April 1951 to power the company's new 220 (W187). It was the first engine with a cylinder bore greater than its stroke that Mercedes had installed in a production car, while using a reverse-flow cylinder head .

It spawned four variants through 1968, the final and largest being the 2.8 L M130.

Mercedes also unveiled at the 1951 Frankfurt Motor show a larger 3.0-litre M186 ‘big six’ inline-6 to power its new flagship 300 (W186) Adenauer four-door saloon.

While sharing many design features such as staggered valve arrangement and rockers running off a single overhead camshaft driven by a duplex cam-chain, the engines were of completely different design with little or no inter-changeability of parts.

M180 Variants

M180
It powered the W187 220 sedan, coupé, and cabriolet (Type A and B) from 1951 to 1955, the W180 220a sedan, coupé, and cabriolet from 1954 to 1956 and the W105 219 4-door sedan from 1956 to 1959.

It also powered the Unimog 404, a military version of the Unimog, which was built from 1955 until 1980.

M127
The W180 Ponton 220S Sedan, Coupe and Cabriolet of 1956-1959 benefited from the up-rated M180.924 which delivered . In 1958 Bosch mechanical fuel injection was added to the 2.2-litre six and the engine, now giving , was redesignated M127. The M127 was fitted to the last of the Pontons: the rare 1958 W128 220SE, of which fewer than 4000 were produced.

In 1959 the first series of W111 "Fintail" 220SE and 220SEb models was introduced, with the carburetted M180 in the 220b and 220Sb and the M127 used in the 220SEb. The addition of the lower case ‘b’ was added to differentiate the Fintails from the earlier Pontons.

In 1965 the W111/W112 sedans were superseded by the new W108/109 series 250 and 250S (apart from the W111 230/230S, produced from 1965 to 1968). All models received the new 2.3 L engine.

M129
The M180's stroke was increased to produce the 2.5 L engine for the new Mercedes-Benz W108 250S and 250SE. The M129 was fitted with a mechanically controlled six-piston fuel injection pump. A change from four to seven main bearings was necessary in order smoothly to handle the resulting increase in power. A larger capacity oil pump was also specified. Connecting rods were slightly shortened, reflecting the  longer stroke in a block of unchanged overall height. On the fuel injected cars a six-plunger pump replaced the previous car's two plunger pump and the injectors were repositioned to give a more direct angle towards the inlet valve heads. The engine cooling fan now had six blades instead of four and incorporated a viscous coupling which activated the fan only when engine speed exceeded 3,000 rpm or the radiator water temperature reached a preset limit.
The engine of the 250 S was called M108 (for W108 chassis) and only the 250 SE engine was designated M129.

M114
In 1968 the ‘New Generation’ or /8 models were introduced, along with a change to the venerable mid-size six. The M180 engine of the 230/230S was continued in the W114 230 and 230.6, while the M180 of the 250S underwent a few changes and was renamed the M114. This was also available with Bosch D-Jetronic fuel injection, as fitted to the 250CE.

M130
The result was a bore × stroke of), the maximum practical enlargement of the engine given the limitations of the block, which required deletion of water passages between the cylinders. It was used in the W108 280S and 280SE, in the W109 300SEL from December 1967 to January 1970, and in the W113 280SL.

M123

The final incarnation of the M180 line of engines was the 2.5L M123, fitted with the notorious Solex four-barrel carburetor in the W123 chassis 250 produced between 1975 and 1985.

See also
 Mercedes-Benz M186 engine
 List of Mercedes-Benz engines

References 

M180
Straight-six engines
Gasoline engines by model